Adolf Harder (11 February 1927 – 5 April 2003) was a German modern pentathlete. He competed at the 1952 Summer Olympics.

References

External links
 

1927 births
2003 deaths
German male modern pentathletes
Olympic modern pentathletes of Germany
Modern pentathletes at the 1952 Summer Olympics